Kristina Grikaite (born July 25, 2000) is a Russian model of Lithuanian descent.

Early life and career
Grikaite was born on July 25, 2000, in Omsk, Russia. She began her modeling career with Avant Models in Moscow after tagging along with a friend to the agency and was signed immediately. Since S/S 2017, Kris has been an exclusive model for Prada's runway shows. She walked at Prada's S/S 2017 (exclusive), F/W 2017 Menswear, F/W 2017 (opened), S/S 2018 (opened) fashion shows and appeared in Prada's S/S 2017, F/W 2017 and S/S 2018 advertisement campaigns, shot by Willy Vanderperre.

Kris has appeared in editorials for Vogue US, British Vogue, Vogue Paris, Vogue Italia, Vogue Russia, Vogue China, Interview Magazine, Self Service and Love Magazine, photographed by David Mushegain, Steven Meisel, Benjamin Huseby, Patrick Demarchelier, David Sims, Mario Sorrenti, Amy Troost, Paolo Roversi, Christian MacDonald, Craig McDean, Daniel Jackson, Steven Klein and Alasdair McLellan. In May 2017, she appeared on the cover of Vogue Russia, photographed by Ben Weller.

She was included in the "Top Newcomers F/W 2017" Industry Selects list by British Vogue editor-in-chief Edward Enninful on Models.com, and was ranked as one of the "Top 50" models.

References

External links 
Kris Grikaite at Models.com.
Kris Grikaite on Instagram.
Kris Grikaite in VK (personal page)
Kris Grikaite Avant Models

2000 births
Living people
Female models from Omsk
Russian people of Lithuanian descent
Ford Models models
The Lions (agency) models
Prada exclusive models